Ashleigh Barty and Casey Dellacqua were the defending champions, but lost in the final to Raquel Kops-Jones and Abigail Spears, 6–7(1–7), 1–6.

Seeds

Draw

Draw

References
 Main Draw

Aegon Classicandnbsp;- Doubles
Doubles